Jianghai garden is a cultural and natural ecologically friendly park. It lies in the south of Haimen Nantong, near the Yangtze River.

Jianghai garden is established by Sanchang professional high school of Haimen. It covers 350 hectares. It visually shows the agricultural civilization of Haimen's past, present and future. It was completed after two years' construction.

It is an experimental park for middle and primary school's quality-oriented education in Nantong, which provides students with an extracurricular activities camp. At the same time, it offers residents a place for entertainment.

The opening ceremony for the project's initial phase was in September 2001 or September 2002 and took ¥12million to finish.

Areas
Jianghai folk culture area
Traditional farming culture area
modern agriculture demonstration area
Future agriculture demonstration area
Resident holiday recreational area
Primary and middle school students' cognition and plowing trying area
Agricultural professional education area
Agricultural information and commerce area

Attractions
Grain tower, called as "the first tower in Haimen", is like a pagoda and straight into blue sky.
Culture museum records the history of Haimen. There are special customs and tradition took on in the museum and many famous people's statues.
Zhangjian, who is the number one scholar in the late Qing Dynasty, whose statue is exhibited there.
Jianghai Renjia, once peasants lived in, is a place you can experience the rural life.
Water bridge, which is on the surface of water, is very long.

References

Parks in Nantong
Gardens in Jiangsu